The Liverpool School of Tropical Medicine (LSTM) is a higher education institution with degree awarding powers and registered charity located in Liverpool, United Kingdom. Established in 1898, it was the first institution in the world dedicated to research and teaching in tropical medicine. The school has a research portfolio of over £220 million, assisted by funding from organisations such as the Bill & Melinda Gates Foundation, Wellcome Trust and Department for International Development (DFID).

History

LSTM was founded on 12 November 1898 by Sir Alfred Lewis Jones, a prominent local ship owner.  At the time, Liverpool was a prominent port city which carried on an extensive trade with overseas regions such as West and Southern Africa.  Consequently, the number of patients in the region admitted to hospital with 'tropical' diseases soared. Recognising the need for a solution to this problem Jones, together with a number of fellow business men and health pioneers, pledged an annual donation of £350 for three years to promote the study of tropical diseases in the city. This offer of financial support was announced at the annual dinner of students of Liverpool's Royal Southern Hospital and was warmly accepted by the hospital's president who later went on to suggest that his hospital should act as the clinical focus of the studies in view of its proximity to the docks.

This initial endeavour later led to Jones's participation in helping to set up the School of Tropical Medicine. Having received news that the RSH greatly appreciated the collection of the hospital's 'tropical' cases into one centre rather than 'leaving them scattered about in the general wards' the suggestion was made that the arrangement might be made permanent. In light of this, the professional members of the hospital's committee were asked to meet and plan the new school; this they did and in due course the committee communicated its intention to the Colonial Office (which was, at the time, responsible for such matters).

In its response, the Colonial Office acknowledged the creation of the School of 'Tropical Diseases' at University College, Liverpool and commented on how 'excellently equipped for teaching of tropical medicine' it was, but made quite clear that no financial aid would be forthcoming as a similar Hygiene and Tropical Medicine had so recently been established in London with the support of the Colonial Secretary of the day, Joseph Chamberlain. The Colonial Office did concede, however, that all future candidates for the service who had attended training programmes in Liverpool would be given preference when applying.

Apparently the Liverpool School was nevertheless still unsuitable for doctors joining the Colonial Service since the letter continued: 'I propose that Officers already in the Colonial Service should be allowed to receive their instruction in Liverpool instead of at the School in London, but newly appointed Officers will always be sent to the latter School'. Liverpool did not accept this compromise and continued its pressure for full recognition. At last, on 12 July 1900 the Colonial Office finally acquiesced and the school was placed on the same terms as London with regard to newly appointed Officers. Similar recognition was given by the Foreign Office, which was responsible for Britain's protectorates. Thus, although the Liverpool School came into active being six months before the school in London, it took another year to persuade the Colonial Office to recognise it officially.

It was not long before the school, helped largely by private donations from individuals like Mary Kingsley (the author of "Travels in West Africa" and an expert in African culture), began to flourish. The school soon recruited the eminent physician Rubert Boyce as its inaugural dean. Boyce then set about the business of appointing teaching staff and secured the services of Ronald Ross as the school's first lecturer in Tropical Medicine. The department was based in the Thompson Yates Laboratory until 1903 when the Johnston Laboratories opened. In 1902 Ross became the first British recipient of the Nobel Prize in Physiology or Medicine for his work on malaria transmission and in the same year a separate department of Tropical Veterinary medicine was set up with a dedicated laboratory at Crofton Lodge in Runcorn to allow for the study of large animals. Other notable staff of the time included Joseph Everett Dutton who discovered one of the trypanosomes that cause sleeping sickness, Harold Wolferstan Thomas who developed the first effective treatment for the disease, and his collaborator Anton Breinl, who later became 'the father of tropical medicine' in Australia.

When Alfred Lewis Jones died in 1909 he left a large bequest to the school. Thanks to this and other donations that it received the school was able to set up its own laboratory and teaching premises in Pembroke Place, separate from the University of Liverpool, upon whose facilities it had previously relied. The laboratory was completed in 1914 but due to the advent of the war occupation of the building by LTSM was deferred and it was used as a Tropical Diseases Hospital offering courses to officers of the Royal Army Medical Corps. Professor R M Gordon joined the school in 1919 and by 1920 teaching had resumed and the school finally moved into its own building.

In 1921, the school opened its first overseas research laboratory in Freetown, Sierra Leone. This laboratory functioned continuously until the early stages of World War II and made many important discoveries in West Africa, including demonstrating that a species of black fly was responsible for transmission of filarial worm to humans, causing river blindness. It was work like this that was essential for the Liverpool school to understand tropical diseases and subsequently the school completed 32 expeditions to Africa and Central and South America over the following years.

In 1946, the appointment of LSTM's longest serving Dean, Brian Maegraith, marked a broadening of the School's size and curriculum.  Maegraith famously declared 'Our impact on the tropics should be in the tropics!’ which resulted in the school forging links with other research institutions across the globe and bringing research innovations to those most in need.  An ongoing example of this is the Malawi Liverpool Wellcome Trust Clinical Research Programme which conducts research into local diseases of importance to Malawi.

From 2000 until 2019 LSTM was directed by Janet Hemingway, who initiated large financial investment and expansion. The school received higher education institution status in 2013 and in 2017 was awarded its own degree awarding powers by the Privy Council.

Location

The school is located in buildings in Liverpool close to Royal Liverpool University Hospital.

Organisation and administration

The school's traditional emblem depicts a Viking longboat under sail and was designed by the famed Glaswegian designer Herbert MacNair. The elements of the emblem all have meaning.

The Viking longboat depicted in the emblem is a reference to Liverpool's maritime heritage and the school's location in Northern England, an area with significant historical links to Scandinavia that was subject to Viking invasion and the Danelaw throughout the tenth century. The fact that the ship is depicted under sail refers to 'journeys to unknown destinations', a reflection on the school's mission to research and treat tropical diseases. Similarly, the rising sun placed directly behind the ship indicates the beginning of the journey and pays respect to its auspicious motives. Finally, the eye depicted on the ship's sail pays homage to ancient deities connected with healing, particularly in Greek mythology.

The school's current logo is derived from its traditional emblem and depicts a stylised red-maroon sail.

The school's director is elected by its governing council every three to five years, with no limit on the number of terms that any individual director can be re-elected to. While Sir Rubert Boyce became the school's first director upon its foundation in 1898 there would not be another 'director' for almost ninety years. This is because the director post that Boyce held became associated with the newly endowed chair of tropical medicine upon its creation in 1902. From this date the title of director was replaced with that of 'Dean' until it was brought back into use with the election of David Molyneux in 1991.

Academic profile
LSTM has a broad portfolio of basic and translational research and policy activities in infectious diseases and public health research.  To achieve this, the school is split into four departments: (a) International Public Health (b) Tropical Disease Biology (c) Clinical Sciences and (d) Vector Biology.

Department of International Public Health
The Department of International Public Health specialises in the use of research to guide policies, strengthen health systems and improve health care.  This is achieved through work on monitoring and evaluation, gender equity, capacity strengthening and research into the role of human resources in policy development.  The Department also leads research into the development and scale-up of large scale, complex interventions to prevent the spread of HIV and houses the rapidly expanding Centre for Maternal and Newborn Health.

Department of Tropical Disease Biology
The Department of Tropical Disease Biology conducts internationally rated basic research on tropical parasites such as malaria, lymphatic filariasis, onchocerciasis, soil-transmitted helminths, schistosomiasis, trypanosomiasis and leishmaniasis, as well as research into snakebite and neglected tropical diseases.  Housed in LSTM's Centre for Tropical and Infectious Disease the department is a global leader in drug and diagnostics discovery and disease pathogenesis.

Department of Clinical Sciences
The Department for Clinical Sciences focuses on improving the management of important diseases in the tropics.  Researchers work across a broad spectrum of clinical sciences, including: experimental medicine; evidence synthesis; clinical trials; implementation and evaluation; teaching and clinical practice. 
Specific areas of interest include clinical infectious disease epidemiology, developing preventative and therapeutic strategies for respiratory infections, and improving child and adolescent health.

The Department also hosts the Cochrane Infectious Diseases Group who help inform global policy by working closely with the World Health Organization and others to prepare systematic reviews in tropical infectious diseases.

Department of Vector Biology
The Department of Vector Biology has a research profile that spans from functional genomics of disease vectors to clinical trials, implementation research and the development of tools for monitoring and evaluation of disease transmission.  The Department's research is centred on improving the control of vector borne diseases in the developing world, with a focus on neglected tropical diseases and malaria.  
Understanding mosquito behaviour, evolutionary genomics and the extent, causes and impact of insecticide resistance on malaria control is major research strength of the department.

This Department has long been one of the world's premier sites of research on African Animal Trypanosomiasis (AAT, nagana), the major livestock disease in Africa.

Cross cutting themes
Overlaid on this structure are five cross-cutting themes, which draw upon expertise from all four research departments. The themes are: Capacity Development; Centre for Applied Health Research and Delivery; Evidence-based Medicine; Neglected Tropical Diseases and the Centre for Health in the Eastern Mediterranean.

Teaching
LSTM offers a range of postgraduate education programmes, teaching over 600 students from around the world.  These vary from taught master's degrees in humanitarian assistance and international public health, diplomas and short courses in tropical and infectious diseases, to research degrees leading to MPhil, DrPH and PhD.

Awards
The Mary Kingsley Medal was instituted by LSTM co-founder John Holt in 1903 and is awarded for outstanding contributions in the field of tropical medicine. It is named in honour Mary Kingsley, a noted traveller and writer of the late 19th century, who had a powerful influence on the way Africa was perceived at the time, and who died in South Africa at the age of 38 from suspected typhoid. The 100th award was made in 2015.

Recipients of the award include Patrick Manson, David Bruce, Waldemar Haffkine, Bernard Nocht, Hans Vogel, and Frederick Vincent Theobald.

Notable people

Directors and deans

 Sir Rubert Boyce (1898–1902)
 Sir Ronald Ross (1902–1913)
 Lt Col. John W Watson Stephens (1913-1929)
 Prof. Warrington Yorke (1929–1943)
 vacant (1943-46)
 Prof. Brian Maegraith (1946–1975)
 Prof. Wallace Peters (1975–1978)
 Prof. Herbert M Gilles (1978–1983)
 Prof. William MacDonald (1983-1988)
 Prof. Ralph Hendrickse (1988-1991)
 Prof. David Molyneux (1991–2000)
 Prof. Janet Hemingway (2000–2019)
 Prof. David Lalloo (2019–present)

Staff

 Anton Breinl - discovered that atoxyl cures trypanosomiasis and established the first Australian Institute of Tropical Medicine in Townsville, Queensland, Australia
 Janet Hemingway, CBE, FRS, FMedSci, FRCP -  A British Parasitologist. Current Professor of Insect Molecular Biology at LSTM.
 Warrington Yorke, FRS - A British parasitologist, and Professor of Tropical Medicine at the University of Liverpool. Was born on 11 April 1883 and he died on 24 April 1943, at the age of 71.

Alumni

The following are some of the notable alumni of the school:

 Francis Edward Camps, FRCP, FRCPath - An English pathologist, who lived from 1905 until 1972.
 Ian Clarke, MBChB BAO, DTM&H, MSc - Born and raised in Northern Ireland, he has both British and Ugandan citizenships. He migrated to Uganda in 1987 and built two hospitals from scratch. Ian Clarke is a physician, missionary, philanthropist, entrepreneur and politician, currently serving as Mayor of Makindye Division, a borough of Kampala, the capital city of Uganda.
 Kevin De Cock, MD, FRCP (UK), DTM&H - An American physician.  Director of the U.S. Centers for Disease Control and Prevention (CDC) Country Mission to Kenya.
 Matthew Lukwiya, MBChB, MSc, MPH - A Ugandan physician and pediatrician, formerly the Medical Director of St. Mary's Hospital Lacor. Died of Ebola Hemorrhagic Fever at Lacor Hospital, on 5 December 2000, at the age of 43.  
 Sir Milton Margai - The first Prime Minister of Sierra Leone.
 Letitia Obeng - studied at the school for her PhD in the early 1960s, becoming the first woman from Ghana to be awarded a doctorate. Her research focussed on the growth of disease vectors in freshwater lakes, particularly the blackfly that carry river blindness. She is often referred to as the 'grandmother of all female Ghanaian scientists'.
 Brigadier John Alexander Sinton, VC, OBE, FRS, DL - A British military officer, medical doctor and malariologist, who was born on 2 December 1884 and died on 25 March 1956.
 Professor Fred Wabwire-Mangen, MBChB, DTM&H, MPH, PhD - Ugandan physician, public health specialist and medical researcher. Professor of Epidemiology and Head of Department of Epidemiology & Biostatistics at Makerere University School of Public Health.

See also
 Hospital for Tropical Diseases in London
 Liverpool Knowledge Quarter
 Prince Leopold Institute of Tropical Medicine, (Belgium)
 Royal Society of Tropical Medicine and Hygiene

References

External links
 LSTM Home page
 B.G.Maegraith - "History of the Liverpool School of Tropical Medicine" from National Institutes of Health
 BBC Report on Bill Gates donation
 A Century of Achievement for the School of Tropical Medicine
 Special Programme for Research and Training in Tropical Diseases
 Video profile on the New Liverpool School of Tropical Medicine complex (video)

Educational institutions established in 1898
University of Liverpool
Medical research institutes in the United Kingdom
Medical schools in England
Research institutes in Merseyside
1898 establishments in England
Research institutes established in 1898
Tropical medicine organizations
Charities based in England